Hohenbuehelia petaloides is a species of fungus belonging to the family Pleurotaceae.

It was first described in 1785 by Jean Baptiste François Pierre Bulliard, but was assigned to the new genus, Hohenbuehelia, in 1866 by Stephan Schulzer von Müggenburg.

It has a cosmopolitan distribution.

Synonym:
 Hohenbuehelia geogenia

References

Pleurotaceae